A court of Justice is each one of the appellate courts of the state court system of Brazil.

See also
 Desembargador
 Judiciary of Brazil#Courts of Justice
 Tribunal de Justiça do Estado do Rio Grande do Norte
 Tribunal de Justiça do Estado de Sergipe

Judiciary of Brazil
Subnational supreme courts